Luweero District (also spelled as Luwero) is a district in the Central Region of Uganda. Luweero is the site of the district headquarters.

Location
Luweero District is bordered by Nakasongola District to the north, Kayunga District to the east, Mukono District to the southeast, Wakiso District to the south, and Nakaseke District to the west. The coordinates of the district are 00 50N, 32 30E (Latitude:0.8333; Longitude:32.500).

Overview
Luweero District was the site of a fierce insurgency by the rebel group National Resistance Army and a brutal counter-insurgency by the government of Milton Obote, known as the Luweero War or the "Bush War", that left many thousands of civilians dead during the early to mid-1980s. The area affected by the war has come to be known as the Luweero Triangle. In 2005, Nakaseke County was split from Luweero District to form Nakaseke District. Luweero District is administered by the Luweero District Administration, with headquarters at Luweero. There are several town councils within the district, each with its own urban town council:

 Bombo
 Luweero
 Wobulenzi
 Bamunanika
 Kalagala
 Kalule
 Ndejje
 Ziroobwe

Population
The 1991 national census estimated the population of the district at 255,400. The national census conducted in 2002 estimated the population at 341,300. In 2012, the population was estimated at 440,200. The August 2014 national population census enumerated the population at 458,158.

Economic activities
Agriculture is the mainstay of the district economy. It has been estimated that 85 percent of the district population are engaged in agriculture.

Points of interest
The following additional points of interest are located in Luweero District:
 Main Campus of Bugema University
 Main Campus of Ndejje University
 a branch Campus of Kampala University
 Bamunanika Palace, one of the palaces of the Kabaka of Buganda, located at Bamunanika
 headquarters of the Uganda Land Forces, a unit of the Uganda People's Defence Force, located at Bombo
 Bombo Military Hospital, one of the two military hospitals in Uganda, the other being Mbuya Military Hospital

References

External links
About Luweero District

 
Districts of Uganda
Central Region, Uganda